The Town Went Wild is a 1944 American comedy film directed by Ralph Murphy and starring Freddie Bartholomew and Edward Everett Horton

Plot 
Like Romeo and Juliet, next door neighbours David Conway and Carol Harrison are deeply in love with each other 
though their fathers have been feuding for a lifetime.  With David due to go to the Alaskan Territory for engineering work for the United States Government, the pair decide to elope.  David gets his best friend, Carol's brother Bob to witness their wedding at a Justice of the Peace in a neighbouring town using Millie, who has an infatuation with Bob to drive them to the town in her car and act as another witness.

Arriving at the Justice of the Peace, their wedding has to be delayed as state law requires the couple to post banns of marriage in the local newspaper for three days prior to the wedding. Returning to their own town, David prepares the banns to be published as soon as possible and goes to the local town hall to obtain his birth certificate for his government posting.  The clerks discover that due to the fathers of Bob and David fighting when the children were born, the two infants were mixed at the hospital with David being a Harrison and Bob being a Conway.  Not only is Carol set to marry her brother, but the intention to do so faces a fifteen year prison sentence.

Cast 
Freddie Bartholomew as David Conway
Jimmy Lydon as Bob Harrison
Edward Everett Horton as Everett Conway
Tom Tully as Henry Harrison
Jill Browning as Carol Harrison
Minna Gombell as Marian Harrison
Maude Eburne as Judge Bingle
Charles Halton as Mr. Tweedle
Ruth Lee as Lucille Conway
Roberta Smith as Millie Walker
Ferris Taylor as Mr. Walker
Jimmy Conlin as Lemuel Jones, Justice of the Peace
Monte Collins as Oscar, Public Defender
Olin Howland as Bit Part
Charles Middleton as Sam, Midvale District Attorney
Emmett Lynn as The Watchman
Dorothy Vaughan as Nurse Irma Reeves

Soundtrack

External links 

1944 films
American black-and-white films
1944 romantic comedy films
Films directed by Ralph Murphy
Producers Releasing Corporation films
American romantic comedy films
1940s English-language films
1940s American films